Potamomya is an extinct genus of bivalve mollusc from the late Eocene of Europe.

References

 Potamyoma in the Paleobiology Database
 Fossils (Smithsonian Handbooks) by David Ward (Page 110)

Prehistoric bivalve genera
Eocene bivalves
Eocene animals of Europe
Myida